An ajisãrì is one who arouses others to pray and feast during Ramadan. He goes from house to house, as early as 2:00 AM, beating his kettle drum with a stick and singing (screaming) at the top of his voice.  This is purely a religious duty; it is voluntary. Although the ajisari does not expect to be compensated by his fellow believers, he believes that Allah will reward him, in the hereafter, for forsaking his bed and discomforting himself during the month-long fasting period. 

The name derives from the Arabic word "Suhur," meaning early morning meals during the holy month of Ramadan; it's spelled and pronounced "sãrì" in Yoruba. 

An ajisari is fearless because he believes Allah will protect him for doing HIS (Allah's) work. The ajisari practically works alone, which explains why he's sometimes been called "Lone Ranger." So, unlike Were music, it's rare to see a group of ajisari. In the late 1970s, however, one group in Ibadan, Taiwo-Kehinde Ajisari, The Twin Brothers' Ajisari Group, violated that exclusivity when they suddenly emerged from nowhere.

Nigerian music
Islam in Nigeria